Nationality words link to articles with information on the nation's poetry or literature (for instance, Irish or France).

Events
Torquato Tasso enters the service of Cardinal Luigi d'Este at Ferrara.

Works published

England
 Robert Copland, publication year uncertain
 Arthur Golding, translated from the Latin of Ovid (Books 1–4),  (see also Metamorphosis [Books 1–15])
 Barnabe Googe, translation (from Marcello Palingenio Stellato's Zodiacus vitae [c. 1528]), The Zodiac of Life (see also editions of 1560, 1561)

France
 Rémy Belleau, Bergerie, mix of prose and verse, including Avril; revised and expanded 1572; France
 Pierre de Ronsard:
 Abrégé de l'art poétique français, a handbook intended for beginners in poetry;  French criticism
 Élegies, Mascarades, et Bergerie

Other
 Jan Kochanowski, Chess ("Szachy"), published either this year or in 1564; Polish

Births
Death years link to the corresponding "[year] in poetry" article:
 September 28 – Alessandro Tassoni (died 1635), Italian
 Also:
 Cheng Jiasui (died 1643), Chinese landscape painter and poet
 John Davies of Hereford, birth year uncertain (died 1618), English
 Francis Meres (died 1647), English churchman, author, critic and poet
 Konoe Nobutada (died 1614), Japanese courtier and man of letters known as a poet, calligrapher, painter and diarist
 Andrzej Zbylitowski (died 1608), Polish poet

Deaths
Birth years link to the corresponding "[year] in poetry" article:
 October 14 - Sir Thomas Chaloner the elder (born 1521), English
 December 13 - Konrad Gesner (born 1516), German
 Benedetto Varchi, (born 1502 or 1503), Italian, Latin-language poet
 Approximate date - Hwang Jini (born 1522), Korean kisaeng

See also

 Poetry
 16th century in poetry
 16th century in literature
 Dutch Renaissance and Golden Age literature
 Elizabethan literature
 French Renaissance literature
 Renaissance literature
 Spanish Renaissance literature

Notes

16th-century poetry
Poetry